The Jacob Gitlin Library in Cape Town, South Africa is an archive of information on Judaism, Jewish culture and history, and the nation of Israel. It was founded under the auspices of the South African Zionist Federation in 1959.

The library is housed in the same building as the St. John's Street synagogue, the South African Jewish Museum, the Great Synagogue, and the Holocaust Centre. It is near the Houses of Parliament and the Tuynhuys, lying in a block between Company's Garden, St. John's Street, and a spur of Hatfield Street.

Its namesake, Jacob Gitlin, was secretary of the local Dorshei Zion Society for 27 years.

External links 
 

Buildings and structures in Cape Town
Libraries in South Africa